Gilova Mahalleh (also Romanized as Gīlovā Maḩalleh; also known as Gelvā Maḩalleh) is a village in Hajji Bekandeh-ye Koshk-e Bijar Rural District, Khoshk-e Bijar District, Rasht County, Gilan Province, Iran. At the 2006 census, its population was 473, in 141 families.

References 

Populated places in Rasht County